Mar Elias was a Palestinian refugee camp in the southwestern part of Beirut, Lebanon. The camp was founded in 1952 by the Mar Elias (Prophet Elijah) Greek Orthodox convent and is composed mainly of Christian Palestinians. Almost all the rest of the refugee camps in the area house Muslim Palestinians.

In 2002 there were 1,406 registered refugees in the camp.

References

Further reading
Dalrymple, William (1997): From the Holy Mountain, HarperCollins,   p. 266-75, 287, 362 (Dalrymple interviewed Sarah Daou from Kafr Bir'im)

External links
Mar Elias, articles from UNWRA

Palestinian refugee camps in Lebanon